Tom Palmer is an American television writer and producer. He served as a co-executive producer on the first season of Mad Men and wrote two episodes of the season. Alongside his colleagues on the writing staff he won a WGA award for best new series and was nominated for the award for best dramatic series for his work on the season.

External links

American male screenwriters
American television writers
Living people
American male television writers
Year of birth missing (living people)